The Netherlands women's national squash team represents the Netherlands in international squash team competitions, and is governed by Dutch Squash Federation.

Since 1981, the Netherlands has participated in two semi finals of the World Squash Team Open, in 1979. In 2010, the Netherlands won the European Squash Team Championships.

Current team
 Natalie Grinham
 Milou van der Heijden
 Tessa ter Sluis
 Milja Dorenbos

Past team
 Vanessa Atkinson
 Annelize Naudé
 Margriet Huisman
 Orla Noom
 Karen Kronenmeyer
 Milja Dorenbos

Results

World Team Squash Championships

References

See also 
 Dutch Squash Federation
 World Team Squash Championships
 Netherlands men's national squash team

Squash teams
Women's national squash teams
Squash
Squash in the Netherlands